The Difa-e-Pakistan Council (lit. Defence of Pakistan Council, abbreviated as DPC) is an umbrella coalition of more than 40 Pakistani Political and Religious parties that advocate conservative policies such as closing NATO supply routes to Afghanistan and rejects granting India most-favored nation status (previously agreed by the government of Pakistan but not implemented).

Organization

Chief of Council
In 2012, the Chief of The Defence of Pakistan Council was Sami-ul-Haq.

The council is an alliance of right-wing groups, some of which are banned terrorist outfits.  It is chaired by Sami-ul-Haq and includes leaders of Jamatud Dawa (JuD) and the forbidden Sipah-e-Sahaba Pakistan (SSP), operating under the name of Ahl-e-Sunnat-Wal-Jamaat (ASWJ). Fazlur Rehman Khalil, a founder of Harkat-ul-Mujahideen and currently head of the Ansar-ul Umma, is another leading cleric in the council.  According to the council's website, 36 organizations or people are part of the DPC (although only 33 are listed due to misnumbering): JUI-S (Sami-ul-Haq) (President)
 Jamatud Dawa (Hafiz Muhammad Saeed) (Vice President)
 JI (Siraj-ul-Haq) (Secratry General)
 Ahle Sunnat Wal Jamaat (Muhammad Ahmed Ludhianvi) (Joint Secraitery)
 JUP (Dr. Sahibzada Abdul Khayr Zubair, Shah Ovais Noorani)
 JUI-N (Asmatullah, A. Qadir)
 Jamiat Mashaikh Ahle Sunnah
 Muslim Conference AJK (Sardar Atiq Ahmed)
 Majlis-e-Ahrar-e-Islam  (Abdul Latif Khalid Cheema)
 Mohsinan-e-Pakistan (Abdullah Gul, representative of A. Q. Khan)
 Pakistan Water Movement (Nasr)
 Tehreek e Ittehad (former Gen. Hamid Gul)
 Muslim League Zia (Ijaaz ul Haque)
 Awami Muslim League (Sheikh Rasheed Ahmed)
 Tehreek-e-Hurmat Rasool (Amir Hamza)
 Secretary Gen DPC (Muhammad Yaqoob Sheikh)
 Ansar ul Ummah (Fazal-ur-Rehman Khalil)
 AMTKN (Ismail Shujabadi)
 Pakistan Ulema Council (Tahir Mehmood Ashrafi)
 Tehreek-e-Azaadi Kashmir (Saifullah Mansoor)
 Muslim League-Sher-e-Bangal (Dr. Sualeh Zahoor)
 AMTKN-International (M. Ilyas Chinoti)
 Sunni Ulema Council (M. Ashraf Tahir)
 Christian Community (Yusuf)
 Sikh Community (Sardar Shaam)
 Hindu Community Lahore (Manohar Chand)
 Hindu Community Khi (Ramesh Laal)
 Jamiat Ittehad ul Ulema – Pakistan
 Jamat Ahle-Hadith Pakistan (Hafiz Abdul Ghaffar Ropri)
 Jamiat Ahle-Hadith (former Gen. Ibtisam Elahi Zaheer)
 Mutahida Jamiat Ahl-e-Hadith (Naeem Badshah)
 Majlis-e-Ahrar-e-Islam (Syed Muhammad Kafeel Bukhari)
 Jamiat Ashat Tauheed sunnah (Tayyab Tahiri)

Activities
The umbrella organization was formed in November 2011 in response to the deaths of 24 Pakistani soldiers who were killed by American gunships and warplanes along the Afghan border.  Pakistan closed NATO supply routes to Afghanistan after the strikes but reopened the routes in July 2012 when U.S. Secretary of State Hillary Clinton apologized.  Thousands of supporters rallied in Islamabad on 9 July 2012 in protest of the government's decision to reopen the lines. Several other organizations such as Tanzeem e Islami send delegates for debate or speech to the Difa e Pakistan Council Forums upon request as non-member guest speakers or participants in debate, or in some cases as observers.

References

External links
The Express Tribune –  Difa-e-Pakistan Council: Ahead of 40-party rally, JuD chief parries questions on electoral ambitions
The Express Tribune – Peshawar civil society demands ban on Difa-e-Pakistan – 6 March 2012
Jamiat Ulema-E-Pakistan Leaves Difa E Pakistan Council – 22 May 2012
Ahle Sunnat Wal Jamaat (religious organization)

Political party alliances in Pakistan
Far-right politics in Pakistan
Insurgency in Khyber Pakhtunkhwa
Islamist front organizations
Hafiz Muhammad Saeed